Death to Capitalist Hardcore is an EP by English grindcore band Sore Throat. It was originally released on 7" vinyl by Acid Rain Records in early 1988 to a pressing of 1000 copies, and has been bootlegged multiple times since. The cover artwork depicts a suited man being impaled on a spike, clutching what appears to be a record by Texan hardcore/crossover band Dirty Rotten Imbeciles who, at the time, were enjoying a brief period of commercial success.

The album is an example of micro-songs, with an average song length of less than 20 seconds. Also of note are the several songs attacking other bands, including the shortest (5 second) Fungicidal Tendencies, targeted at Suicidal Tendencies.

Background
Drummer Nicholas Royles said of the experience:

Track listing

Personnel
Sore Throat
Rich "Militia" Walker (Rawhead Rex) - Vocals, Lyrics, Layout

Brian "Bri" Talbot (Rancid Trout) - Guitar, Lyrics

Jon "Doom" Pickering (Howard the Porpoise) - Bass, Lyrics

Nick Royles (Bilbo Baggins) - Drums, Lyrics

Additional screams by Hammy Plank, Neil Stench Head & Russell Chud

Production
Guy Hatton - engineering

Clown - Front cover artwork 

Chris Quarthon - Front cover logo

Russell Snell - Back cover drawing

References

 http://www.discogs.com/Sore-Throat-Death-To-Capitalist-Halmshaw/release/1908525

Sore Throat (grindcore band) albums
Grindcore EPs
1987 EPs